Halipeurus pelagicus  is a species of phtilopterid louse found on seabirds including European storm petrel and Wilson's storm petrel.

References

Lice
Parasites of birds
Insects described in 1842